By:Aditi Jha

ALU, Alu or alu may refer to:

Computing and science
Computing
Arithmetic logic unit, a digital electronic circuit

Biology
Alu sequence, a type of short stretch of DNA
Arthrobacter luteus, a bacterium

Organizations
Abraham Lincoln University, Los Angeles, California, USA
African Leadership University
Alcatel-Lucent, a telecommunications equipment company
Amazon Labor Union
American Labor Union
Army Logistics University, Fort Lee, Virginia, USA
Sarajevo Academy of Fine Arts (Bosnian: Akademija likovnih umjetnosti Sarajevo, acronym: ALU)

People
Andrea Alù, a scientist
Alu (musician), Los Angeles, US

Places

Villages and boroughs
Alu, Ardabil, a village in Iran
Alu, Mazandaran, a village in Iran
Alu, Estonia, a small borough in Rapla Parish, Rapla County
Alu, Pärnu County, a village in Tõstamaa Parish, Pärnu County, Estonia

Volcanoes
Alu (Ethiopia)
Alu, Sulu, Philippines

Other
Alû, the Mesopotamian demon of night
Alu (runic), in Germanic paganism

See also
Aloo (disambiguation)